Scinax pedromedinae is a species of frog in the family Hylidae. It is found in Peru, and possibly in Bolivia and Brazil. Its natural habitats are subtropical or tropical moist lowland forests and intermittent freshwater marshes. This frog is threatened by habitat loss.

References

pedromedinae
Amphibians of Peru
Amphibians described in 1991
Taxonomy articles created by Polbot